The blotched snakehead (Channa maculata)  is a species of snakehead. It is one of four species of the genus Channa native to China. It is also to native northern Vietnam and Taiwan, but has been widely introduced to other countries, where it is an invasive species.

References

Blotched snakehead
Fish of East Asia
Fish described in 1801